Paul McCloskey (born 3 August 1979) is a former professional boxer from Northern Ireland who competed from 2005 to 2013. He held the British super-lightweight title from 2008 to 2009; the European super-lightweight title from 2009 to 2011; and challenged once for the WBA super-lightweight title in 2011. As an amateur, McCloskey won a silver medal in the welterweight division at the 2003 European Union Championships, and was an Irish Senior amateur champion.

Gaelic games
McCloskey played both Gaelic football and hurling at underage and briefly at senior level for the local clubs in Dungiven – St. Canice's Dungiven and Kevin Lynch's respectively. He was part of the Dungiven side that won the Derry Senior Football Championship and Ulster Senior Club Football Championship in 1997.

Amateur career
McCloskey boxed out of the St. Canices ABC and fought for Ireland at amateur level and was a three-time Irish champion and five-time senior Ulster champion in the light welterweight division. He failed to qualify for the 2004 Summer Olympics by ending up in third place at the 2nd AIBA European 2004 Olympic Qualifying Tournament in Warsaw, Poland.

Professional career
McCloskey turned professional in March 2005 on the undercard of a bill that included Eamonn Magee and Neil Sinclair at the King's Hall, Belfast. In his debut McCloskey defeated experienced Englishman "Dangerous" David Kehoe with a third-round knockout.

In December 2007 he won the IBF International light-welterweight title, stopping Tontcho Tontchev in round four.

After beating Nigel Wright on points in July 2008, he fought Colin Lynes on 5 December 2008 for the vacant British light-welterweight title. McCloskey won, forcing Lynes to retire after the ninth round.

Following his British title victory, McCloskey was named Boxer of the Year at the Irish National Boxing Awards in January 2009.

On 13 March, McCloskey retained his British light-welterweight title in emphatic fashion with a fourth-round stoppage of Dean Harrison in Widnes.

McCloskey won the vacant European light welterweight title on 6 November 2009, when he defeated Spanish boxer Daniel Rasilla after original opponent and champion Mbaye withdrew due to injury.

McCloskey defended his European title against Giuseppe Lauri from Italy on 11 June at the Kings Hall, Belfast, with an 11th-round knockout.

McCloskey's next defence of his European title was against Barry Morrison in Letterkenny, County Donegal, on 2 October 2010. McCloskey won the fight with a seventh round stoppage of his Scottish opponent.

His third defence of the title would've been against second Italian challenger, Michele Di Rocco on 5 March 2011.
Michele Di Rocco has a record of (21–1–1) with 12 kos and his only loss was by knockout in the 7th round against Giuseppe Lauri, whom McCloskey knocked out in the 11th round. But this match has been cancelled due to the Khan fight being worked out.

McCloskey vs. Khan 

He was defeated by Amir Khan at the Manchester Evening News Arena on Saturday 16 April 2011 when the fight was stopped in the sixth round. This was the result of an accidental head clash which left McCloskey with a cut above his eye.

McCloskey vs. Prescott 

McCloskey won his fight against Breidis Prescott in a world title eliminator on 10 September 2011 by unanimous decision, with two judges scoring the bout 114–113, and the third judge scoring it 115–113. During the fight Prescott dominated the early rounds, scoring a knockdown in the first round by clearly pushing his with his forearm and later breaking McCloskey nose which bleed heavily throughout the fight. However, McCloskey rallied in the second half of the fight and won the later rounds. The decision proved to be controversial with many believing Prescott had done enough to win.

Professional boxing record

References

External links

1979 births
Living people
Male boxers from Northern Ireland
Light-welterweight boxers
People from Dungiven
Irish male boxers
European Boxing Union champions
British Boxing Board of Control champions